The Alburni are an Italian mountain range of the Province of Salerno, Campania, part of the Apennines. Due to their geomorphology, they are popularly known as the "Dolomites of Campania" or of Southern Italy. The highest mountain is the Panormo (1,742 amsl). Its second name, Alburno, gives the name to the whole range.

Overview
Part of the Lucan Apennines and included in Cilento National Park, the Alburni are located in the eastern area of Cilento, near the borders between Campania and Basilicata. In north-east the range degrades into the plain of Vallo di Diano. Some of the rivers flowing below the mountains are the Calore Lucano, Tanagro, Fasanella and Ripiti.

The karstic nature of the mountains favoured the formation of several caves, more than 400. The most famous are the show caves of Castelcivita and Pertosa.

On the road pass between Sant'Angelo a Fasanella and Petina there are located the Antece, an ancient rock sculpture (5th/6th century BC), and the observatory of Casone d'Aresta.

List of mountains

See also
Gelbison, a mountain in the middle of Cilento
Cervati, a mountain in southern Cilento

References

External links

 Alburni Mountain Community

Mountains of Campania
Mountain ranges of the Apennines
Cilento